Ormeau Woods State High School is a public secondary school located in the suburb of Ormeau on the Gold Coast, Queensland, Australia. It is situated on the corner of Goldmine Road. The school first opened in 2009 with Ross Wallace as the foundation principal. The school motto is "Linking learning with life".

Facilities 
Stage One of the school opened in 2009. Facilities included science laboratories, a research and resource centre, industrial workshops, kitchen, design and graphics studio, multimedia studio, business and computer rooms and general learning areas.

Stage Two opened in 2011 and included senior schooling facilities such as: kitchens, engineering workshop, construction workshop, interactive computer technology centre, creative industries studios, multi-purpose centre and science laboratories.

Stage Three opened in 2013 and included a performing arts centre, music block and a two-storey senior general learning area.

Stage Four opened in 2018 and included two new two-story senior study buildings including a learning centre and a business and lab design centre. Named “Innovate”, this new building was renovated in 2020 to include additional classrooms on the first floor. This allowed for eight new classrooms to accommodate for the overwhelming growth of the school.

Stage Five, opening in 2022, included a brand new two-story building dubbed “Inspire”. The Inspire building features more than 10 classrooms, with the lower level focusing on physics, engineering, fashion, and design. The upper level focuses on general learning classrooms, usually occupied with health and sports classes.

External links 
 

Schools on the Gold Coast, Queensland